Scaptesylodes modica is a moth in the family Crambidae. It is found in Indonesia (Sumatra) and Malaysia.

References

Moths described in 1976
Spilomelinae